John Stanley Crisson (born May 1, 1941) was a Canadian football player who played for the Hamilton Tiger-Cats. He won the Grey Cup with them in 1965. He played college football at Duke University in Durham, North Carolina.

References

1941 births
Hamilton Tiger-Cats players
Living people
Duke University alumni
People from Cherryville, North Carolina